Paul Christopher Neville (20 March 1940 – 1 January 2019) was an Australian politician who was a National Party member of the Australian House of Representatives from March 1993 to August 2013, representing the Division of Hinkler, Queensland.  After the Queensland chapters of the Nationals and Liberals merged in 2008 as the Liberal National Party of Queensland, Neville continued to sit with the Nationals in Parliament.

Biography
Neville was born in Warwick, Queensland, and was a theatre supervisor, Queensland State Secretary, Arts Council of Australia and manager of the Bundaberg District Tourism and Development Board before entering politics. He was National Party Whip from 1998 until his retirement in 2013. Credit for preserving the Parliament House centenary flag has been given to Neville who on 18 September 2001 during the Centenary of Federation requested of the Speaker that "before it [the flag] becomes too faded or too tattered, [it] be taken down and perhaps offered to a museum or an art gallery as the seminal flag that flew over this building 100 years from the time the first flag was flown?"

It has subsequently been paraded at schools to mark Australian National Flag Day on a tour of the Australian Capital Territory, New South Wales and Queensland.

Neville, a long-time resident of Limpus Crescent, Kalkie died at the Bundaberg Base Hospital, aged 78 in the early hours of 1 January 2019 after suffering health problems for some time. He and his wife Margaret were the parents of five children.

It was announced on Australia Day 2019 Neville had been awarded a Medal of the Order of Australia (OAM) in recognition of his dedication to the Bundaberg community. It is unclear who nominated Neville for the prestigious award, however to meet prerequisites it is indicated that he must have been nominated prior to his death on 1 January 2019.

References

1940 births
2019 deaths
National Party of Australia members of the Parliament of Australia
Liberal National Party of Queensland members of the Parliament of Australia
Members of the Australian House of Representatives
Members of the Australian House of Representatives for Hinkler
People from Bundaberg
21st-century Australian politicians
20th-century Australian politicians